Agustín Dávila Padilla (Mexico City, 1562–1604) was a Mexican Dominican, a writer and Bishop of Santo Domingo.

Works

Dávila Padilla was not the author of numerous works, but his Historia de la Fundación y Discurso de la Provincia de Santiago de México de la Orden de Predicadores por las vidas de sus varones insignes y casos notables de Nueva España (Madrid, 1596; Brussels, 1625) is an important history of the Dominicans in Mexico from 1526 until 1592.   As was typical of such a work, Dávila Padilla emphasized the virtues of fellow Dominicans, as well as their work among the indigenous.  He deals with the founder of the Mexican province, Fray Domingo de Betanzos and Fray Bartolomé de Las Casas, among others. His work is an important source of early colonial Mesoamerican ethnohistory. Beristain mentions a third edition of 1634. While not free from mistakes, it was a major chronicle of the Dominican Order and its missions in America up to the end of the sixteenth century.

References

Nicolás Antonio, Bibliotheca hispana nova (2d ed., Madrid, 1733–1738); 
León y Pinelo, Epitome de la Biblioteca oriental y occidental (2d ed., Madrid, 1737); 
Eguiara, Biblioteca mexicana (Mexico, 1755); 
Beristain de Souza, Biblioteca hispano-americana (2d ed., Mexico, 1883); 
Joaquín García Icazbalceta, Bibliografia mexicana (Mexico, 1886);
Diccionario universal de Historia y Geografía (Mexico); 
Gil Gonzales Dávila, Teatro eclesiástico de la primitiva Iglesia de las Indias occidentales (Madrid, 1654).

External links and additional sources
 (for Chronology of Bishops) 
 (for Chronology of Bishops) 
Catholic Encyclopedia article

1562 births
1604 deaths
Mexican Dominicans
17th-century Roman Catholic archbishops in the Dominican Republic
Dominican bishops
Bishops appointed by Pope Clement VIII
Royal and Pontifical University of Mexico alumni
Roman Catholic archbishops of Santo Domingo